Harold Leon Brazier (born October 22, 1955 in South Bend, Indiana) is an American former boxer.

Fighting at light welterweight and welterweight, Brazier's career spanned three decades and 127 professional fights. He fought such opponents as Pete Podgorski, Robin Blake, John Meekins, Buck Smith, Roger Mayweather, Pernell Whitaker, Meldrick Taylor, Vince Phillips, Micky Ward, Lloyd Honeyghan, Juan Martin Coggi and Billy Collins. He lost a split decision to Mayweather in a challenge for the WBC light-welterweight title in 1988. A year later, he unsuccessfully challenged for the WBA light-welterweight title, this time losing to Coggi.

Brazier retired in 2004 with a final record of 105-18-1 64ko's along with three no-decision bouts.

Harold is the brother of fellow professional boxer Kevin  Brazier.

References

External links
 

!colspan="3" style="background:#C1D8FF;"| Regional titles
|-

1955 births
Living people
African-American boxers
Boxers from Indiana
Sportspeople from South Bend, Indiana
Light-welterweight boxers
Welterweight boxers
American male boxers
21st-century African-American people
20th-century African-American sportspeople